CYRL, Cyrl or cyrl may refer to:

 Red Lake Airport, ICAO code
 Cyrillic script, ISO 15924 code